Lecithocera sublunata is a moth in the family Lecithoceridae. It is found in Papua (then called Irian Jaya) Indonesia.

The wingspan is about 12 mm.

References

Moths described in 1954
sublunata